There have been two Finnish formations called II Corps (II Armeijakunta, II AK):

 II Corps during the Winter War
 II Corps during the Continuation War